Nevill is an English toponymic surname derived from Neville, may refer to:

People
 British peerage
Nevill baronets, two extinct creations, one of 1661 and one of 1675
House of Nevill (Note: the spellings "Nevill" and "Neville" have both been used, often interchangeably)
Viscount Nevill, a junior title of the Marquess of Abergavenny
Edward Nevill, 7th Baron Bergavenny ( - 1588)
Edward Nevill, 8th Baron Bergavenny ( – 1622)
John Nevill, 10th Baron Bergavenny ( - 1662)
Edward Nevill, 15th Baron Bergavenny ( - 1724)
John Nevill, 3rd Earl of Abergavenny (1789-1845)
William Nevill, 4th Earl of Abergavenny (1792-1868)
Reginald Nevill, 2nd Marquess of Abergavenny (1853-1927)
Lord Richard Nevill (1862–1939)
Guy Larnach-Nevill, 4th Marquess of Abergavenny (1883-1954)
John Nevill, 5th Marquess of Abergavenny (1914-2000)
Patricia Nevill, Marchioness of Abergavenny (1915-2005), friend and Lady of the Bedchamber to Elizabeth II
Lord Rupert Nevill (1923-1982)
Christopher Nevill, 6th Marquess of Abergavenny (born 1955)

 Given name
Nevill Catlin (1634-1702), English landowner and politician
Nevill Coghill (VC) (1852-1879), Irish recipient of the Victoria Cross
Nevill Coghill (1899-1980), English literary scholar, known for his modern English version of Geoffrey Chaucer's Canterbury Tales
Nevill Drury (1947-2013), English-born Australian editor, publisher and author
John Nevill Eliot (died 2003), English entomologist
Philip Nevill Green (born 1953), British business executive
Nevill Lee (1898-1978), English cricketer
Nevill Francis Mott (1905-1996), English physicist who won the Nobel Prize for Physics in 1977 for his work on the electronic structure of magnetic and disordered systems
Nevill Smyth (1868-1941), major-general in the British Army, recipient of the Victoria Cross
Nevill Vintcent (1902–1942), South African aviator and airline founder
Nevill Willmer (1902-2001), British histologist

 Surname
Adam Nevill (born 1969), English writer of supernatural horror stories
Amanda Nevill (born 1957), English arts administrator
Arthur de Terrotte Nevill (1899-1985), New Zealand military aviator and administrator
Arthur Jones-Nevill ( – 1771), Irish politician
Bernard Nevill (1930–2019), British designer and academic
Caroline Emily Nevill (1829–1887), early British photographer
Charles William Nevill (1815-1888), Welsh owner of a copper smelting company and a Conservative Party politician
Christopher Nevill (1800-1847), English cricketer
Cosmo Nevill (1907-2002), British Army officer
Craig Nevill-Manning (active from 2001), New Zealand computer scientist
Lady Dorothy Nevill (1826-1913), English writer, hostess, horticulturist and plant collector
Edmund Neville Nevill (1849-1940), British-born South African astronomer
Geoffrey Nevill (died 1885), British malacologist who worked at the Indian Museum, Kolkata, brother of Hugh
Geoffrey Nevill (died 1972), New Zealand public servant and Resident Commissioner of the Cook Islands
George Nevill (disambiguation), multiple people
Henry Nevill (disambiguation), multiple people
Hugh Nevill (1847-1897), British civil servant, known for his scholarship and studies of the culture of Sri Lanka, brother of Geoffrey
Jim Nevill (1927-2007), British policeman, head of the Scotland Yard Bomb Squad
Luke Nevill (born 1986), Australian basketball player
Mark Nevill (born 1947), Australian politician
Mary Nevill (disambiguation), multiple people
P. B. Nevill (1887-1975), English scoutmaster, recipient of the Silver Wolf Award
Peter Nevill (born 1985), Australian cricketer
Richard Nevill (1654-1720), Irish politician
Richard Nevill (1743–1822), Irish politician
Samuel Nevill (1837–1921), first Anglican Bishop of the Diocese of Dunedin in Dunedin, New Zealand
Ted Nevill (active from 1989), British writer on military history
Thomas Nevill (by 1484 - 1542), English politician, of the House of Nevill
Thomas Nevill (priest) (1901–1980), English Anglican priest and school teacher
Wilfred Nevill (1894-1916), British soldier, known for initiating the "Football Charge" on the first day of the Battle of the Somme (1916)
William Nevill (disambiguation), multiple people

Places
Nevill Bay, a waterway in Kivalliq Region, Nunavut, Canada
Nevill Ground, a cricket venue located in Royal Tunbridge Wells, Kent, England
Nevill Holt, a hamlet and civil parish in the Harborough district of Leicestershire, England
Nevill Holt Opera, an arts festival held annually since 2013 at Nevill Holt

Other uses
The Nevill Feast, a single-movement orchestral composition of 2003 by American composer Christopher Rouse
Nevill Hall Hospital, a district general hospital in Abergavenny, north Monmouthshire, Wales

See also
Nevil (disambiguation)
Neville (disambiguation)
Nevills (disambiguation)